Sir William Johnson Taylor, 1st Baronet (23 October 1902 – 26 July 1972) was a Conservative and National Liberal Party politician in the United Kingdom.

At the 1945 general election he stood unsuccessfully in the Bradford East constituency in West Yorkshire, losing in that year's landslide by a wide margin to the Labour Party candidate Frank McLeavy.  After boundary changes, he stood at the 1950 general election in the neighbouring Bradford North, where he unseated the Labour MP Muriel Nichol.

Taylor served under Harold Macmillan as Parliamentary Secretary to the Ministry of Supply between 1957 and 1959, when the post was abolished, and as Under-Secretary of State for Air between 1959 and 1962. He held Bradford North until his defeat at 1964 general election by Labour's Ben Ford. He was created a Baronet, of Cawthorne in the West Riding of the County of York, in 1963. He died in July 1972, aged 69, when the baronetcy became extinct.

References

 UK General Elections since 1832

External links 
 

1902 births
1972 deaths
National Liberal Party (UK, 1931) politicians
Conservative Party (UK) MPs for English constituencies
UK MPs 1950–1951
UK MPs 1951–1955
UK MPs 1955–1959
UK MPs 1959–1964
Politicians from Bradford
Baronets in the Baronetage of the United Kingdom
Ministers in the Macmillan and Douglas-Home governments, 1957–1964